Alfred Dreares II (January 4, 1927 – November 17, 2011) was an American jazz drummer.

Early life
Dreares was born in Key West, Florida, on  January 4, 1927. He was a childhood friend of Fats Navarro, and studied at Hartnett Conservatory in New York City on the advice of his father, a trumpeter.

Later life and career
He played early in his career in the bands of Paul Williams, and with Teddy Charles in 1955. The next year he played with Charles Mingus. In 1957 he recorded with Freddie Redd and worked with Kenny Burrell; 1958 saw him with Gigi Gryce, and 1959 with Phineas Newborn. He also led his own bands from the late 1950s.

Other credits include recordings with Mal Waldron and Julian Euell, and Bennie Green.

Discography

As sideman
With Bennie Green
Walkin' & Talkin' (Blue Note, 1959)
Bennie Green (Time, 1960)
With Freddie McCoy
Listen Here (Prestige, 1968)
With Freddie Redd
San Francisco Suite (Riverside, 1957)
With Frank Strozier
March of the Siamese Children (Jazzland, 1962)
With Mal Waldron
Left Alone (Bethlehem, 1959)
Les Nuits de la Negritude (Powertree, 1964)
Sweet Love, Bitter (Impulse!, 1967)
With Randy Weston
Jazz à la Bohemia (Riverside, 1956)

Main sources:

References

American jazz drummers
Musicians from Florida
2011 deaths
1927 births
20th-century American drummers
American male drummers
20th-century American male musicians
American male jazz musicians